The People's Republic of the Congo competed at the 1972 Summer Olympics in Munich, West Germany.  The nation returned to the Olympic Games after missing the 1968 Summer Olympics.

Results by event

Athletics
Men's 100 metres
Alphonse Yanghat
 First Heat — 10.95s (→ did not advance)

Men's 800 metres
Alphonse Mandonda
 Heat — 1:51.2 (→ did not advance)

Men's 4 × 100 m Relay
Antoine Ntsana Nkounkou, Luis Nkanza, Jean-Pierre Bassegela, and Théophile Nkounkou
 Heat — 39.86s 
 Semifinals — 39.97s (→ did not advance)

References
 Official Olympic Reports

External links
 

Nations at the 1972 Summer Olympics
1972
1972 in the Republic of the Congo